Bowden  is a town in central Alberta, Canada.

The community may take its name from Bowdon, Greater Manchester, in England. A provincial Alberta Land Surveyor reference relates this alternate name source, "The most widely accepted version says that a surveyor named Williamson suggested that this siding on the Edmonton-Calgary Trail take the maiden name of his wife."

History 
During the World War II an area of land 4 kilometres north of the town was appropriated by the Royal Canadian Air Force for construction of an Air Training Base. RCAF Station Bowden was home to No. 32 Elementary Flying Train School (EFTS).

After the war the site was converted to the Bowden Institution, originally as a provincial facility. In 1974 it was converted to a Corrections Canada medium security penitentiary.

The town describes itself as a bedroom community, meaning a large proportion of the working population commutes to other employment centres, including Red Deer and Calgary.

Geography 
Nearby communities include Innisfail to the north, Caroline to the west, Huxley to the east and Olds to the south.

Climate

Demographics 

In the 2016 Census of Population conducted by Statistics Canada, the Town of Bowden recorded a population of 1,240 living in 524 of its 581 total private dwellings, a  change from its 2011 population of 1,241.

Attractions 
Bowden has a nine-hole golf course with a licensed clubhouse. The Paterson Community Centre and the Friendship Centre provide venues for family and community functions. The Pioneer Museum offers an insight into past community life and the past history of the Town. The pioneer museum features photographs by the local photographer Bob Hoare, who documented local residents around the turn of the twentieth century.

Notable people 

 Neil MacGonigill, music manager and producer, was raised in Bowden

See also 
List of communities in Alberta
List of towns in Alberta

References

External links 

1904 establishments in Alberta
Towns in Alberta